David Cutler Group, renamed Hudson Palmer Homes in 2017, is a Plymouth Meeting, Pennsylvania-based company and the largest privately held residential builder of new luxury homes and luxury communities in Philadelphia's Delaware Valley area.

Overview
Hudson Palmer Homes, formerly known as the David Cutler Group, is a leading regional homebuilder. Most of its homes are single-family luxury residences and communities in Berks County, Pennsylvania; Bucks County, Pennsylvania; Chester County, Pennsylvania; Montgomery County, Pennsylvania and Delaware County, Pennsylvania.  They are one of the few large homebuilders that still practices the building process of "stick-building."  A stick-built home is one where the building is completely constructed on site piece-by-piece rather than by pre-fabricated frames.

New home communities and markets
Cities:
 Ambler, Pennsylvania
 Blue Bell, Pennsylvania
 Chalfont, Pennsylvania
 Chester Springs, Pennsylvania
 Collegeville, Pennsylvania
 Doylestown, Pennsylvania
 East Norriton, Pennsylvania
 Gwynedd, Pennsylvania
 Harleysville, Pennsylvania
 Hilltown, Pennsylvania
 Horsham, Pennsylvania
 Huntingdon Valley, Pennsylvania
 Jamison, Pennsylvania
 Lansdale, Pennsylvania
 Lower Gwynedd, Pennsylvania
 Malvern, Pennsylvania
 Montgomeryville, Pennsylvania
 Norristown, Pennsylvania
 North Wales, Pennsylvania
 Penllyn, Pennsylvania
 Royersford, Pennsylvania
 Southampton, Pennsylvania
 Thornton, Pennsylvania
 Warrington, Pennsylvania
 Worcester, Pennsylvania

Counties:
 Bucks County, Pennsylvania
 Chester County, Pennsylvania
 Delaware County, Pennsylvania
 Montgomery County, Pennsylvania
 Northampton County, Pennsylvania

Primary subsidiaries and divisions
 HPH Financing
 HPH Conveyancing Division
 HPH Service and Warranty Division

Principal competitors
Companies often competing in the same markets include Centex, D.R. Horton, KB Home, Lennar Corporation, Pulte Homes, Ryland Group Inc, and Toll Brothers.

References

External links
 

Construction and civil engineering companies of the United States
Home builders
Manufacturing companies based in Pennsylvania
Companies based in Montgomery County, Pennsylvania
Privately held companies based in Pennsylvania
American companies established in 1980
1980 establishments in Pennsylvania